Lake Placid High School is a high school located in Lake Placid, Florida. It is operated by the Highlands County Schools District.

Lake Placid High School is ranked 279th within Florida. LPHS offers students the choice of several Advanced Placement coursework and exams. The AP participation rate at LPHS is 42%. LPHS is 1 out of 7 total high schools in Highlands County. The school is in rural Florida surrounded by orange groves and small businesses.

Minority enrollment is 51% of the student body (majority Hispanic), which is lower than the Florida state average of 61%.

References 

 http://www.highlands.k12.fl.us/~lph/
 https://www.usnews.com/education/best-high-schools/florida/districts/highlands/lake-placid-high-school-5054

High schools in Highlands County, Florida
Public high schools in Florida